Wes Meier (born c. 1968–69) is a former American football coach.  He was the head coach of the Southern Utah Thunderbirds football team from 2004 to 2007.

Coaching career

Meier served as an assistant at Southern Utah for one year in 2003 before being named head coach in January 2004 after Gary Andersen resigned to become the defensive line coach at Utah.

After four seasons, Meier had compiled a 10–33 record and was let go after the 2007 season.

Personal life

Meier is now a real estate agent.

Head coaching record

References

Living people
Southern Utah Thunderbirds football coaches
Utah Utes football players
Southern Utah University alumni
University of Utah alumni
Year of birth missing (living people)